Brandley Mack-Olien Kuwas (born 19 September 1992) is a professional footballer who plays as an attacking midfielder for Turkish club Giresunspor. Born in the Netherlands, he represents the Curaçao national team.

International career
Kuwas is of Curaçaoan descent, and played an unofficial match for the Curaçao national football team against Dutch club Excelsior in November 2016. Kuwas made his international debut for Curaçao in a friendly 1–1 tie with El Salvador on 22 March 2017.

Career statistics

International goals
Scores and results list Curaçao's goal tally first.

References

External links
 
 
 Voetbal International profile 

1992 births
Dutch people of Curaçao descent
Living people
People from Hoorn
Curaçao footballers
Curaçao international footballers
Dutch footballers
Footballers from North Holland 
Association football midfielders
FC Volendam players
Excelsior Rotterdam players
Heracles Almelo players
Al-Nasr SC (Dubai) players
Al Jazira Club players
Maccabi Tel Aviv F.C. players
Giresunspor footballers
Eredivisie players
Eerste Divisie players
UAE Pro League players
Israeli Premier League players
Süper Lig players
Dutch expatriate footballers
Curaçao expatriate footballers
Expatriate footballers in Israel
Expatriate footballers in the United Arab Emirates
Expatriate footballers in Turkey
Curaçao expatriate sportspeople in the United Arab Emirates
Dutch expatriate sportspeople in the United Arab Emirates
Curaçao expatriate sportspeople in Israel
Dutch expatriate sportspeople in Israel
Curaçao expatriate sportspeople in Turkey
Dutch expatriate sportspeople in Turkey